Marabda is a community in  Georgia, located some 23 km south of the capital Tbilisi, and a few kilometers north of Marneuli. It consists of three villages Akhali Marabda, Kotishi and Dzveli Marabda. According to the 2014 Georgian Census population of the community is 488.

Transport 
Marabda is served by a Georgian Railway station on the Tbilisi–Gyumri line, 23 km south of Tbilisi Junction. In the 1980s, Marabda itself became a railway junction, as a branch line to Akhalkalaki (160 km to the west) was completed in 1986.

The treaty to build the Kars-Tbilisi-Baku railway — which will include the (rehabilitated) Akhalkalaki-Marabda line — was signed at Marabda.

See also 
 Battle of Marabda
 Railway stations in Georgia
 Kvemo Kartli

References 

Populated places in Tetritsqaro Municipality